Lacy is an extinct town in Stanley County, in the U.S. state of South Dakota. The GNIS classifies it as a populated place.

History
A post office called Lacy was established in 1903, and remained in operation until 1942. The town has the name of a local pioneer settler.

References

Ghost towns in South Dakota
Geography of Stanley County, South Dakota